Upon the Wings of Music is an album by French jazz fusion artist Jean-Luc Ponty. It was released in 1975 on Atlantic, his first record for the company.

Track listing 
All songs written by Jean-Luc Ponty.
"Upon the Wings of Music" – 5:26
"Question with No Answer" – 3:29
"Now I Know" – 4:27
"Polyfolk Dance" – 5:12
"Waving Memories" – 5:43
"Echoes of the Future" – 3:09
"Bowing-Bowing" – 4:53
"Fight for Life" – 4:34

Personnel 
 Jean-Luc Ponty – electric violin, violectra, acoustic violins, strings synthesizer
 Ray Parker Jr. – electric rhythm guitar & guitar solos
 Dan Sawyer – electric rhythm guitar
 Patrice Rushen – acoustic & electric piano, Hohner clavinet, synthesizer, organ
 Ralphe Armstrong – electric bass guitar
 Leon "Ndugu" Chancler – drums, Remo rototoms, percussion

Production notes
 Larry Hirsch – engineer, mixing
 Kerry McNabb – mixing
 Christian Simonpietri – photo
 Abie Sussman – design
 Bob Defrin – art director

References

External links 
 Jean-Luc Ponty - Upon the Wings of Music (1975) album review by Scott Yanow, credits & releases at AllMusic
 Jean-Luc Ponty - Upon the Wings of Music (1975) album releases & credits at Discogs
 Jean-Luc Ponty - Upon the Wings of Music (1975) album credits & user reviews at ProgArchives.com
 Jean-Luc Ponty - Upon the Wings of Music (1975) album to be listened as stream on Spotify

1975 albums
Jean-Luc Ponty albums
Atlantic Records albums